Mohammad Ashkanani (born February 5, 1984 in Kuwait) is a Kuwaiti professional basketball player. He plays for Kazma of the Kuwait basketball league.  He is also a member of the Kuwait national basketball team.

Ashkanani competed for the Kuwait national basketball team at both the FIBA Asia Championship 2007 and FIBA Asia Championship 2009.  At the 2007 tournament, he played sparingly off the bench for the 15th placed Kuwait team.  In 2009, he received more playing time and averaged 14.2 points and 7 rebounds per game, leading the team in both categories, as the Kuwaiti team improved to an 11th-place finish.

References

External links
Profile at realgm.com

1984 births
Living people
Kuwaiti men's basketball players
Kuwaiti people of Iranian descent
Basketball players at the 2006 Asian Games
Basketball players at the 2010 Asian Games
Basketball players at the 2014 Asian Games
Forwards (basketball)
Asian Games competitors for Kuwait